A  (plural ) or  (plural ) refers to a spell or incantation in Old Norse and Old English respectively; these were usually performed in combination with certain rites.

Etymology
In Old High German the  suffix produced  instead.

The words are also cognate with Dutch  "to yell, scream".

Attestations

Old Norse
Some incantations were composed in a special meter named . This meter was similar to the six-lined , also used for ritual, but added at least one more C-line. Diverse runic inscriptions suggest informal impromptu methods. Another characteristic is a performed parallelism, see the stanza from Skirnismál, below.

A practical  for women was one that made childbirth easier, but they were also notably used for bringing madness onto another person, whence modern Swedish  meaning "mad", derived from the verb gala ('to sing, perform galdr'). Moreover, a master of the craft was also said to be able to raise storms, make distant ships sink, make swords blunt, make armour soft and decide victory or defeat in battles. Examples of this can be found in Grógaldr and in Frithiof's Saga. In Grógaldr, Gróa chants nine (a significant number in Norse mythology)  to aid her son, and in Buslubœn, the schemes of king Ring of Östergötland are averted.

It is also mentioned in several of the poems in the Poetic Edda, and for instance in Hávamál, where Odin claims to know 18 . For instance, Odin mastered galdrar against fire, sword edges, arrows, fetters and storms, and he could conjure up the dead and speak to them. There are other references in Skírnismál, where Skirnir uses  to force Gerðr to marry Freyr as exemplified by the following stanza:

Old English
In Beowulf,  is described as having been used to protect the dragon's hoard that was buried in a barrow:

Interpretation and discussion
It was performed by both women and men. Some scholars have proposed they chanted it in falsetto.

See also
 Grógaldr
 Runic magic
 Icelandic magical staves
 Seiðr

Notes

Bibliography
 Schön, Ebbe. (2004). Asa-Tors hammare, Gudar och jättar i tro och tradition. Fält & Hässler, Värnamo. 
 Steinsland, G. & Meulengracht Sørensen, P. (1998): Människor och makter i vikingarnas värld. 

Germanic paganism
Magical terms in Germanic mysticism
Witchcraft in Sweden
Incantation